Arctowski Cove is a small cove at the southeast side of Point Thomas in Admiralty Bay, King George Island. Named by a Polish Antarctic Expedition (1977–79) after Henryk Arctowski, Polish meteorologist with the Belgian Antarctic Expedition, 1897–99, and in association with the Henryk Arctowski Polish Antarctic Station on Point Thomas.

References
 

Poland and the Antarctic
Coves of King George Island (South Shetland Islands)